Spirostreptida is an order of long, cylindrical millipedes. There are approximately 1000 described species, making Spirostreptida the third largest order of millipedes after Polydesmida and Chordeumatida.

Description
Spirostreptida are generally large, long and cylindrical, with 30 to 90 body rings. Eyes are present in most. This order contains the longest millipedes known: the giant African millipedes of the genus Archispirostreptus that may exceed .

Distribution
Spirostreptida contains mainly tropical species, and occurs in Africa, Southern Asia to Japan, Australia, and the Western Hemisphere from the United States to Argentina.

Evolutionary history 
Like most millipede groups, they have a fragmentary fossil record. The oldest record of the group is the extinct family Electrocambalidae, which is known from the Burmese amber of Myanmar, dating to the Cenomanian stage of the Late Cretaceous around 99 million years ago, which belongs to the suborder Cambalidea. The only other fossil records of the group are Protosilvestria from the Oligocene of France, which belongs to either Cambalidae or Cambalopsidae, and an undescribed species of Epinannolene (Pseudonannolenidae) from the Miocene aged Dominican amber.

Classification
The order comprises two suborders, Cambalidea and Spirostreptidea, the latter further divided into two superfamilies.
Suborder Cambalidea
Cambalidae
Cambalopsidae (includes the former Glyphiulidae and Pericambalidae)
Choctellidae
Iulomorphidae
Pseudonannolenidae
†Electrocambalidae
Suborder Spirostreptidea
Superfamily Odontopygoidea
Atopogestidae
Odontopygidae
Superfamily Spirostreptoidea
Adiaphorostreptidae
Harpagophoridae
Spirostreptidae

Select species
Phyllogonostreptus nigrolabiatus- a large species from India
 Spinotarsus caboverdus- a species that has become an agricultural pest in Cape Verde

References

External links

 
Millipede orders